Debra Sina is a monastery in the highlands of Eritrea near Keren in the Anseba Region.

History

It was the site of the first Holy Communion prepared in the Eritrean Orthodox Church, by the 4th-century bishop Aba Salama. It is one of the oldest monasteries in Africa and the world, because probably built in the third century.

The monastery is the site of a pilgrimage by Eritrean Orthodox believers each year in June. The pilgrimage centers on a church above the village where a vision of Mary was said to have been seen by shepherd girls beneath a large boulder.  The church is built adjacent to and over the rock where the vision was seen.  The pilgrimage includes thousands of ordinary Eritrean believers camping for one night in the village of Debra Sina, singing, drumming, chanting and celebrating Mary.

See also
 List of Eritrean Orthodox monasteries

References

Bibliography
 Killion, Tom (1998). Historical Dictionary of Eritrea. The Scarecrow Press. ISBN 0-8108-3437-5.

Eritrean Orthodox monasteries
Anseba Region
Oriental Orthodox monasteries in Eritrea